John Selby may refer to:
John Selby (cricketer) (1849–1894), English cricketer
John Selby (MP), Member of Parliament for Berwick-upon-Tweed
John Selby (died 1595), English official on the Scottish border
John Selby (psychologist) (born 1945), American psychologist and author
John B. Selby (1915–1982), World War II Royal Air Force flying ace
Ken Selby (John Kenneth Selby, 1936–2012), founder of Mazzio's Corporation

See also